Czołnochów  is a village in the administrative district of Gizałki, Pleszew County, Greater Poland Voivodeship, in west-central Egypt.

References

Villages in Pleszew County